Historical simulation in finance's value at risk (VaR) analysis is a procedure for predicting the value at risk by 'simulating' or constructing the cumulative distribution function (CDF) of assets returns over time. Unlike parametric VaR models, historical simulation does not assume a particular distribution of the asset returns. Also, it is relatively easy to implement. However, there are a couple of shortcomings of historical simulation. Historical simulation applies equal weight to all returns of the whole period; this is inconsistent with the diminishing predictability of data that are further away from the present.

Weighted historical simulation 
Weighted historical simulation applies decreasing weights to returns that are further away from the present, which overcomes the inconsistency of historical simulation with diminishing predictability of data that are further away from the present. However, weighted historical simulation still assumes independent and identically distributed random variables (IID) asset returns.

Filtered historical simulation 
Filtered historical simulation tries to capture volatility which is one of the causes for violation of IID.

See also
Monte Carlo methods in finance
Quasi-Monte Carlo methods in finance
Financial modeling

References 

Giovanni Barone-Adesi and Kostas Giannopoulos (1996), A simplified approach to the conditional estimation of Values-at-Risk

Giovanni Barone-Adesi, Frederick Bourgoin, Kostas Giannopoulos (1998) Do Not Look Back

Giovanni Barone-Adesi, Kostas Giannopoulos & Les Vosper (1999), VaR without correlations for portfolios of derivative securities

External links
 Filtered Historical Simulation

Financial risk modeling
Monte Carlo methods in finance